Atuq Wachana (Quechua atuq fox, wacha birth, to give birth, -na a suffix, "where the fox is born", erroneously also spelled Atcchuachana) is a mountain in the Andes of Peru, about  high. It is situated in the Ayacucho Region, Cangallo Province, Totos District, northwest of Totos.

References

Mountains of Peru
Mountains of Ayacucho Region